David Upthegrove (born May 3, 1971) is an American politician. He is a member of the King County Council, representing the 5th district since 2014. A member of the Democratic Party, he was a member of the Washington House of Representatives, representing the 33rd district from 2002 to 2013.

Early life and education 
Upthegrove is a descendant of the Dutch Op den Graeff family. He was born and raised in King County, Washington and attended Lakeside School in Seattle. He earned a Bachelor of Arts degree in environmental conservation from the University of Colorado Boulder and a graduate certificate in energy policy planning from the University of Idaho.

Career 
Upthegrove was appointed to the Washington House of Representatives in January 2002 and was elected to a two-year term in November 2002. He was then re-elected at two-year intervals until running for King County Council.

While serving in the Washington House of Representatives, Upthegrove was chair of the Environment Committee and also served on the Local Government and Transportation Committee. He is a former chair of the Select Committee on Puget Sound. He has been involved in education policy, sponsoring and passing legislation to improve the teaching of civics and to better meet the needs of recent immigrant students. The Washington Conservation Voters called Upthegrove "a leader on environmental issues and a rising star in the House." Upthegrove led high-profile environmental initiatives to clean up Puget Sound and to clean up soil at schools and day cares contaminated by a local Asarco copper smelter.

References

External links

Democratic Party members of the Washington House of Representatives
1971 births
Living people
Gay politicians
LGBT state legislators in Washington (state)
University of Colorado alumni
People from Burien, Washington
King County Councillors
21st-century American LGBT people